Jan Thomas is a veterinary scientist and career academic. Thomas is currently the sixth vice-chancellor of Massey University, New Zealand and the second woman to hold the position. Thomas is the first female veterinarian and only the second veterinarian to become a Vice-Chancellor in either Australia or New Zealand.

Thomas has stated she believes university education should be accessible to all, and believes in high-quality online education that is delivered in ways that cater to the student. She has been a supporter of indigenous and minority groups throughout her career. Upon joining Massey University, she took up lessons in te reo Māori in an effort to become fluent in the language. Thomas has stated her ambition for Massey University is to become a te Tiriti-led organisation and contribute to a socially progressive Aotearoa.

Early career 
Prior to her academic career, Thomas worked as a veterinary surgeon, diagnostic veterinary pathologist and a private laboratory consultant. After graduating BVMZ in 1983 she spent a year working in a small-animal clinic in Perth, WA, then moved to Melbourne to do her master's degree, which she completed in 1986. Thomas returned to Murdoch University in 1987 to work in diagnostic veterinary pathology and was awarded membership of the Australian College of Veterinary Scientists. Thomas decided to pursue a career in academia having seen the power universities have to transform lives.

Academic career 
Thomas holds a Bachelor of Science in veterinary biology (1981), a Bachelor of Veterinary Medicine and Surgery (1983), both from Murdoch University in Perth, Australia; a Master of Veterinary Studies in pathology from the University of Melbourne (1986) and a Doctor of Philosophy from Murdoch University (1997), where she gained a reputation for excellence in research and scholarship as a supervisor of PhD students. Thomas has published widely on her veterinary research, including articles on feline immunodeficiency virus (FIV) infection and clinical pathology, topics that were part of her PhD.

She has held a number of leadership positions at universities throughout Australasia. Prior to her appointment at Massey University, she was Vice-Chancellor and President of the University of Southern Queensland in Toowoomba, Australia, a role she had held since 2012. She has also served as Deputy Vice-Chancellor Research and Quality and Deputy Vice-Chancellor Fremantle at the University of Notre Dame Australia in Western Australia (2010–11) and Deputy Vice-Chancellor Academic at Murdoch (2003–10).

In October 2016 it was announced she would be the sixth Vice-Chancellor of Massey University and commenced in the role in January 2017. Then-Chancellor Chris Kelly said Thomas was selected for her proven academic background and experience in senior management roles in university environments.

On September 18, 2018, it was revealed via documents released under the OIA New Zealand that Thomas used her influence as the Vice-Chancellor to silence Dr Don Brash the day before he was due to give a speech to Politics Society at Massey University. A review by Massey University's council subsequently cleared her of wrongdoing, with Chancellor Michael Ahie stating that the Council supported and had full confidence in Professor Thomas. Massey University's Māori staff association Te Matawhānui publicly spoke out in support of Thomas, particularly due to her leadership of Massey as a te Tiriti-led university.

Professional memberships 

 Fellow of the Australian Institute of Company Directors  
 Fellow of the Australian Institute of Management 
 Member of the Australian and New Zealand College of Veterinary Scientists 
 Chair of the Quality Assurance Council, Hong Kong 
 Member of the Hong Kong University Grants Committee
 Former chair of the Council for the Association of Commonwealth Universities

Honours, decorations, awards and distinctions 

 Recipient of a Murdoch University Vice-Chancellor’s Excellence in Teaching Award (1996)  
 Recipient of the inaugural Australian Veterinary Association’s Excellence in Teaching Award for outstanding teaching in Veterinary Science (1998) 
 Recipient of the inaugural Catherine McAuley Award for Leadership to women aged 25 – 40 who have demonstrated outstanding leadership or potential to lead in their designated area (1999)  
 Recipient of Murdoch University’s Vice-Chancellor’s Equity Award (1999)  
 Women’s Achievement Award, World Education Congress Mumbai (2012)
 Education Leadership Award, World Marketing Summit Kuala Lumpur (2013)  
 Education Leadership Award, World Education Congress Mumbai (2014)  
 Murdoch University Distinguished Alumni Award winner (2016) 
 Finalist, Telstra Queensland Business Woman of Year award (2016)

References 

Academic staff of the Massey University
Living people
Australian veterinarians
Women veterinarians
Academic staff of the University of Southern Queensland
1962 births
Fellows of the Australian Institute of Company Directors